The 1991–92 Football Cup of Yugoslavia was the national knock-out football competition in the Socialist Federal Republic of Yugoslavia, which was held during the breakup of the state.

The republics of Croatia and Slovenia declared their independence on 25 June 1991, during the football off-season. By the Brioni Agreement, the two republics delayed the implementation of independence until 8 October. While the two countries were nominally still part of Yugoslavia, their clubs withdrew from the Yugoslav football system. Over the course of the competition, Macedonia and Bosnia and Herzegovina declared independence on 8 September 1991, and on 5 March 1992, respectively. On 28 April 1992, the Federal Republic of Yugoslavia was constituted by Montenegro and Serbia.

Prior to this season, the cup had borne the name Marshal Tito Cup. This was discontinued as the previous year's champion Hajduk Split had failed to return the Marshal Tito Trophy to the Football Association of Yugoslavia, which no longer had jurisdiction over the club. The trophy was returned to Poljud in 2008, after Hajduk's official and trustee Juko Strinić kept it with himself for 17 years.

First round

|}

Second round

|}

Quarter-finals

|}

Semi-finals

|}

1  Return leg was scheduled to be played on 6 May 1992, but due to Bosnian War and Željezničar club leaving the competition, it was not, hence Partizan were awarded the 3-0 win.

Final

First leg

Second leg 

On 23 May 1992; after the Cup final, the manager of the winning side; FK Partizan, Ivica Osim resigned from his managerial duties with the club.

See also
1991–92 Yugoslav First League
1991–92 Yugoslav Second League

References

External links
Yugoslavia Cup at RSSSF

 

Yugoslav Cup seasons
Cup
Yugo